Jeffrey "Jeff" Young (born March 31, 1962) is an American guitarist. He graduated from Musicians Institute in 1985, and is best known for his time with the thrash metal band Megadeth, appearing on the 1988 album So Far, So Good... So What! (Capitol Records). In 1998, Young co-wrote, produced and played on the world-fusion album Chameleon by Badi Assad. In addition to his subsequent music projects, he served as an author in Guitar for the Practicing Musician.

Early life 
Young was born in Ann Arbor, Michigan. In 1980, he graduated from Fairmont High School in Kettering, Ohio, and moved to Hollywood to attend Musicians Institute/GIT in 1984. He graduated from the Institute in 1985 and began his career as a guitar teacher.

Career

Megadeth 
Newly hired Megadeth's guitarist Jay Reynolds (of Malice) had commissioned guitar teacher Young to play all of his solos on the new album, transcribe the previous Megadeth releases, and teach him everything in time for the pending tours. Reynolds was one of Young's guitar students. However, after witnessing Young decipher previous guitarist Chris Poland's solos from Peace Sells... but Who's Buying? note-for-note in less than 30 minutes, frontman Dave Mustaine decided instead to hire Young. Young joined the band with only two weeks left in the recording schedule and contributed half of the guitar solos and multiple electric and acoustic rhythm parts to the album.

Young's career with Megadeth was spent recording and touring in support of their 1988 platinum selling album, So Far, So Good... So What! His first performance with the band appeared in The Decline of Western Civilization Part II: The Metal Years as a member of Megadeth.

In 1989, Young was fired from Megadeth due to reportedly "contemplating putting the moves on Diana" (Mustaine's Fiancé).

Author and jazz & world fusion excursions 

Following his time in Megadeth, Young wrote the cult-classic Fingerprints column in Guitar for the Practicing Musician magazine. He also began intensive study of the blues with legendary guitarist, Steve Hunter (Peter Gabriel, Lou Reed, Alice Cooper, Jason Becker).

For a portion of the 1990s, Young stepped away from his career to deal with the untimely deaths of first his father and later his mother while immersing himself in the further study of classical, flamenco, gypsy jazz and other world music varieties.

In 1998, he resurfaced with new Brazilian musical partner, Badi Assad. Together, the duo crafted exotic soundscapes for Verve/PolyGram records collaboration entitled, Badi Assad's Chameleon. The album (co-written, arranged, and produced by Young), climbed to the top of the world music charts in Germany & Holland also topping JAZZIZ magazine's Readers Poll: "Best Brazilian Albums of the Year."

Opening concerts for renowned artists including Joe Cocker and Cassandra Wilson, as well as performances on 1999's Lilith Fair and Farm Aid 2000, Young's association with the Assad family also spawned songwriting collaborations with guitar luminary Sérgio Assad and two pieces on Badi's Verde album.

In 2003, the track "Waves" from Chameleon was featured in the Michael and Kirk Douglas film It Runs in the Family, as well as on the movie's soundtrack.

Equilibrium 
In late-October 2009, his debut solo album, Equilibrium, was released on CD worldwide, as well as cdbaby. Young began working on the album in 2000. Stylistically, the album features flamenco, classic, 6 & 12 steel-string guitar styles as well as the electric guitar. Equilibrium features guest performances by Debby Holiday, Twinkle, Gilli Moon, Lenine, Matt Chamberlain, Hilary Jones, Tony Franklin and Viviana Guzman.

Current projects 
Young is the host of the Internet radio show Music Without Boundaries on the Spreaker broadcast network.

Young is currently writing, producing & releasing solo, instrumental music on the High-Tone Eleven Records label. His first, all instrumental album, Revolutions, is being released track by track with the singles, "Monsoon" – "In the Flesh" & "Slow Burn" available now via his official website & most digital distribution sources. Revolutions features performances from some of the world's top players: Tina Guo, Ric Fierrabracci, James LoMenzo, Brian Tichy, Jeff Bowders & Shane Gaalaas.

Personal life 
Young overcame testicular cancer in 2006; he was treated by Dr. Lawence Einhorn, the same physician who treated Lance Armstrong).

Discography 
 1988, Megadeth – So Far, So Good... So What!.
 1998, Badi Assad – Chameleon
 2003, It Runs in the Family (Soundtrack)
 2010, Jeff Young – Equilibrium (Solo)
 2013, Jeff Young – "Monsoon" (Solo single from Revolutions album)
 2020, Jeff Young – "In the Flesh" (Solo single from Revolutions album)
 2020, Jeff Young – "Slow Burn" (Solo single from Revolutions album)

References 

American heavy metal guitarists
Megadeth members
Living people
1962 births
Musicians from Ann Arbor, Michigan
Musicians Institute alumni
Guitarists from Michigan
American male guitarists
American people of English descent
20th-century American guitarists